The Korean Wind Chime is a variety of bell traditionally hung from the exterior corners of Korean Buddhist temples, and functioning as a wind chime.  The bell's clapper is often in the shape of a fish, an auspicious sign in Buddhism.

An elaborate gilt bronze style of Korean wind chime and dragon's head finial became a type of object in later Silla / early Goryeo art.

See also

Wooden fish

References

External links
Korean Buddhist Temple Fish-Shaped Wind Chimes

Bells (percussion)
Wind-activated musical instruments
Buddhist temples in Korea
Ornaments (architecture)
Korean musical instruments